Solodukhin is a Russian masculine surname, its feminine counterpart is Solodukhina. Notable people with the surname include:

Nikolai Solodukhin (born 1955), Russian judoka
Pyotr Solodukhin (1892–1920), Russian military figure
Vladimir Solodukhin (born 1969), Russian footballer and coach
Vyacheslav Solodukhin (1950–1980), Soviet ice hockey player

Russian-language surnames